Tallent is the surname of the following people:

Claire Tallent (born 1981), Australian racewalker
Elizabeth Tallent (born 1954), American fiction writer, academic, and essayist
Garry Tallent (born 1949), American musician and record producer
Jared Tallent (born 1984), Australian race walker, husband of Claire, brother of Rachel
Rachel Tallent (born 1993), Australian racewalker, sister of Jared

See also
Tallents